= Abdulwadamai =

- Location within Pakistan
- Coordinates: 32.51°N 69.84°E
- Country: Pakistan
- Territory: Federally Administered Tribal Areas
- Elevation: 1,748 m (5,735 ft)
- Time zone: UTC+5 (PST)
  - Summer (DST): UTC+6 (PDT)

Abdulwadamai is a town in the Federally Administered Tribal Areas of Pakistan. It is located at 32°30'39N 69°50'31E with an altitude of 1,748 metres (5,735 feet).
